The twenty-second season of Law & Order, an American police procedural and legal drama that premiered on September 22, 2022 on NBC. Mehcad Brooks joins the main cast as Detective Jalen Shaw, following cast member Anthony Anderson's exit after season 21.

Cast and characters

Main
 Jeffrey Donovan as Senior Detective Frank Cosgrove 
  Mehcad Brooks as Junior Detective Jalen Shaw
 Camryn Manheim as Lieutenant Kate Dixon
 Hugh Dancy as Executive Assistant District Attorney Nolan Price
 Odelya Halevi as Assistant District Attorney Samantha Maroun
 Sam Waterston as District Attorney Jack McCoy

Crossover stars from Law & Order: Special Victims Unit 

 Mariska Hargitay as Captain  Olivia Benson
 Kelli Giddish as Detective Amanda Rollins
 Peter Scanavino as Assistant District Attorney Dominick Carisi Jr.

Crossover stars from Law & Order: Organized Crime 

 Christopher Meloni as Detective Elliot Stabler
 Ainsley Seiger as Detective Jet Slootmaekers

Recurring 
 Connie Shi as Detective Violet Yee
 Alayna Hester as Lily Cosgrove
 Milica Govich as Judge Leanne Dreben
 Harriett D. Foy as Judge Arlene Jones
 Marsha Stephanie Blake as Attorney Erica Knight
 David Moreland as Attorney Lou Jenkins
 Lawrence Arancio as Judge Desmond
 Dylan Baker as Sanford Remz

Guest 
 Claire Coffee as Defense Attorney Andrea Rankin
 Michael Boatman as Defense Attorney Dave Seaver

Production

Development 
On May 10, 2022, just before the finale of the previous season, NBC renewed the series for a twenty-second season.

Episodes

References

Lists of Law & Order episodes by season
2022 American television seasons
2023 American television seasons